Neraudia sericea is a rare species of flowering plant in the nettle family known by the common name woodland ma'oloa. It is endemic to Hawaii. It has been found on the islands of Molokai, Maui, Lanai, and Kahoolawe, but it has only been seen recently on Molokai and Maui. There are fewer than 200 individuals remaining. This is a federally listed endangered species of the United States.

References

sericea
Endemic flora of Hawaii
Biota of Maui
Biota of Molokai